Harold Edward Annison (27 December 1895 – 27 November 1957) was an English competitive swimmer, water polo player, and Olympic medallist who represented Great Britain in international competition.

He competed in the 1920 and 1924 Summer Olympics.  In the 1920 Antwerp Olympics he won a bronze medal in the men's 4×200-metre freestyle relay, and was fourth in his first heat of the 100-metre freestyle event, fifth in the semifinal of 400-metre freestyle event, and third in the semifinal of 1500-metre freestyle event, but did not advance in any event.

Four years later at the 1924 Paris Olympics, he was eighth in the 400-metre freestyle event, ninth in the 1500-metre freestyle event and fifth in the 4×200-metre freestyle relay event.  He was also a member of British water polo team, which lost to Hungary in the first round and did not advance.

See also
 List of Olympic medalists in swimming (men)

References

1895 births
1957 deaths
Sportspeople from London
English male freestyle swimmers
English male water polo players
Olympic bronze medallists for Great Britain
Olympic bronze medalists in swimming
Olympic swimmers of Great Britain
Olympic water polo players of Great Britain
Swimmers at the 1920 Summer Olympics
Swimmers at the 1924 Summer Olympics
Water polo players at the 1924 Summer Olympics
Medalists at the 1920 Summer Olympics